Dennis P. Hollinger (born November 1948), is President of Gordon-Conwell Theological Seminary, a position he has held since 2008. He is also the Colman M. Mockler Distinguished Professor of Christian Ethics and Distinguished Fellow with The Center for Bioethics & Human Dignity. Hollinger attended Elizabethtown College for his B.A., Trinity Evangelical Divinity School for his M.Div., Drew University for Ph.D., and has conducted post-doctoral studies at Oxford University.

Hollinger previously held academic appointments at Evangelical Theological Seminary in Myerstown, Pennsylvania, Messiah College in Grantham, Pennsylvania, Associated Mennonite Biblical Seminary in Elkhart, Indiana, and Alliance Theological Seminary in Nyack, New York.

Works

Thesis

Books

Chapters

Journal articles

References

Gordon–Conwell Theological Seminary faculty
Living people
1948 births
Elizabethtown College alumni
Trinity Evangelical Divinity School alumni
Drew University alumni
American evangelicals
Seminary presidents